A Philly Special Christmas is the debut studio album by Philadelphia Eagles offensive linemen Lane Johnson, Jason Kelce, and Jordan Mailata. It was released on December 23, 2022, by Vera Y Records. The Christmas album is produced by Charlie Hall, drummer for the band The War on Drugs. Former Eagles linebacker Connor Barwin served as executive producer. The title of the album is inspired by the Philly Special, a trick play run by the Eagles in Super Bowl LII.

The album consists of covers of original Christmas songs and features duets with Eagles play-by-play announcer Merrill Reese and other players, including Jalen Hurts, A. J. Brown, Brandon Graham, Haason Reddick, and Jordan Davis. All proceeds from the album go towards the Children's Crisis Treatment Center in Philadelphia.

Background
Kelce said that the group of offensive linemen first considered writing the album in 2021. Both Mailata and Kelce have had a background in singing. In 2015, Kelce performed a cover of Cover Me Up by Jason Isbell and his original song Homes Change on WXPN. In 2022, Mailata appeared on the television series The Masked Singer. Mailata has been described as "evoking Frankie Valli in his singing."

Kelce and Barwin reached out to Charlie Hall, the drummer for The War on Drugs and the leader of the indie rock male chorus The Silver Ages, for direction on the creation of the album. Hall stated that he first met with the offensive linemen and "wanted to suss out what they were after. Was this a goof, or was it a sincere thing? I saw right away that it’s truly sincere. They just wanted to make something that’s a love letter to Philly."

The album was recorded during summer 2022 and was finished in July, prior to the start of training camp.

In January 2023, the album placed on several charts.

Track listing

Personnel
Production 
 Produced by Charlie Hall
 Recorded, mixed and additional production by Nick Krill 
 Mastered by Alex DeTurk
 Executive Producer: Connor Barwin
 Additional engineering and assistant engineer at Elm St. Studios: Brendan McGeehan
 Assistant engineer at Rittenhouse Soundworks: Mike Richelle
 Additional engineering for Lady Alma at Worship Recordings: Rob Paine
 Album artwork by Hannah Westerman at Avenue West

Recorded and engineered at
 Germantown, Philadelphia (Rittenhouse Soundworks and Silent Partners Studios)
 Conshohocken, Pennsylvania (Elm Street Studios)

Performance credits from Eagles
 A. J. Brown – featured vocals
 Jordan Davis – featured vocals
 Brandon Graham – featured vocals 
 Jalen Hurts – featured vocals
 Lane Johnson – all vocals
 Jason Kelce – all vocals
 Jordan Mailata – all vocals
 Haason Reddick – featured vocals 
 Merrill Reese – featured vocals

Other performance credits
 Marshall Allen
 Lady Alma
 Eric Bazilian 
 Brandon Beaver
 Robbie Bennett
 Mike Brenner
 Nasir Dickerson
 Eliza Hardy Jones
 Thomas Hughes
 Randy Huth
 Rob Hyman
 Nick Krill 
 Zach Miller
 Kaila Vandever
 The Silver Ages
 Dave Wayne Daniels
 Josh Newman
 Heyward Howkins
 Todd Starlin

See also
A Charlie Brown Christmas (soundtrack), a 1965 album whose cover inspired this one

References

External links
 

2022 Christmas albums
Christmas albums by American artists
Christmas albums by Australian artists
Culture of Philadelphia
2022 National Football League season
Covers albums